The Billboard Music Award for Top Duo/Group was first presented in 1998 to American R&B music trio Next. British boy band One Direction held the record for most wins in the category, with three as of the 2016 BBMAs, until the 2022 edition, when South Korean group BTS earned their third win and tied for the lead.

Winners and nominees
Winners are listed first and highlighted in bold.

1990s

2000s

2010s

2020s

Multiple wins and nominations

Wins

3 wins
 One Direction
 BTS

2 wins
 Destiny's Child
 Imagine Dragons

Nominations

8 nominations
 Maroon 5

4 nominations
 BTS
 Coldplay
 Imagine Dragons
 Linkin Park
 One Direction

3 nominations
 The Black Eyed Peas
 Dan + Shay
 Destiny's Child
 Florida Georgia Line
 U2

2 nominations
 The Chainsmokers
 Lady Antebellum
 Migos
 Nickelback
 Panic! at the Disco
 Twenty One Pilots

References

Billboard awards